Cifuentes may refer to:
Cifuentes, Guadalajara, a municipality in Guadalajara, Spain
Cifuentes, Cuba, a municipality in Villa Clara, Cuba
Infante Dinis, Lord of Cifuentes (1354–1397), son of Portuguese King Peter I
             
People with the surname Cifuentes:
Abdón Cifuentes (1835–1928), Chilean politician
Alberto Cifuentes (born 1979), Spanish footballer
Cristina Cifuentes (born 1964), Spanish politician 
Daniel Cifuentes Alfaro (born 1980), Spanish footballer
Hugo Cifuentes (1923–2000), Ecuadoran photographer
Inés Cifuentes (1954–2014), American seismologist and educator

Spanish-language surnames